Marcos Cláudio Phillipe Carneiro de Mendonça (born December 25, 1894) was a Brazilian footballer who achieved notoriety playing for Fluminense and the Brazil national football team. He was the inaugural goalkeeper for Brazil and played a key role in Brazil's debut cup, the 1919 South American Championship.

References

1894 births
1988 deaths
Brazilian footballers
Fluminense FC players
Association football goalkeepers